Artur Shahinyan (born 8 January 1987) is an Armenian Greco-Roman wrestler.

Shahinyan won a bronze medal at the 2011 European Wrestling Championships in Dortmund. He won another bronze medal at the 2013 European Wrestling Championships in Tbilisi.
Also Shahinyan won a bronze medal at the 2018 World Wrestling Championships in Budapest.

In March 2021, he competed at the European Qualification Tournament in Budapest, Hungary hoping to qualify for the 2020 Summer Olympics in Tokyo, Japan.

References

1987 births
Living people
Armenian male sport wrestlers
World Wrestling Championships medalists
European Wrestling Championships medalists
21st-century Armenian people